Mohd Affize Faisal Bin Mamat (born 14 March 1989) is a Malaysian footballer who plays as a central midfielder.

After.released by Harimau Muda A, Affize should return to his native state of Terengganu like other Harimau Muda alumni. But there's a contractual dispute at the beginning of 2013 season where ATM Fa are offering him contract and he agreed. But Terengganu Fa claimed Affize should play for them according to Harimau Muda clause. 

With Fam interference, Affize signed for Atm and officially announced as their 2013 season signing. Where he helped them win the 2013 Piala Sumbangsih defeated Kelantan.

References

1989 births
Living people
Malaysian footballers
People from Terengganu
ATM FA players
PKNS F.C. players
Malaysia Super League players
Association football midfielders